The UANA Water Polo Cup (ASUA Water Polo Cup) is an international water polo tournament for national water polo teams from North and South America, organized by Swimming Union of the Americas (UANA, or ASUA). It is the continental qualification for the World Aquatics Championships, and men's and women's FINA Water Polo World Cup.

Results

Men

Women

See also
 Water polo at the Pan American Games
 Swimming Union of the Americas

References

External links
 Official website of the Swimming Union of the Americas

 
International water polo competitions